Theodoor is a masculine given name. It is the Dutch form of Theodore. Short forms of Theodoor are Theo, Dorus, Dirck, and Dirk. The latter two are derived from the Germanic name Theodoric (via Diederik) rather than from the Greek/Latin Theodorus. People with the name include:

Theodoor Aenvanck (1633–1690), Flemish painter
Theodoor Boeyermans (1620–1678), Flemish painter
Theodoor Jacobus Boks (1893–1961), Dutch mathematician
Theodoor de Booy (1882–1919), Dutch-born American archaeologist
Theodoor van Cloon (1684–1735), Governor-General of the Dutch East Indies
Theodoor Christiaan Adriaan Colenbrander (1841–1930), Dutch architect, ceramist and designer
Theodoor Doyer (1955–2010), Dutch field hockey player
Theodoor Galle (1571–1633), Flemish engraver
Theodoor Gilissen (1858–1918), Dutch banker
Theodoor Helmbreker (1633–1696), Dutch  painter of Italianate landscapes
 (1802–1861), Dutch Protestant theologian and philologist
Theodoor Gerard van Lidth de Jeude (1788–1863), Dutch physician, veterinarian, and zoologist
Theodoor van Loon (1581–1649), Flemish painter
Theodoor Herman de Meester (1851–1919), Dutch politician, Prime Minister of the Netherlands 1905-1908
Theodoor Overbeek (1911–2007), Dutch physical chemist
Theodoor Gautier Thomas Pigeaud (1899–1988), Dutch linguist
Theodoor van Rijswijck (1811–1849), Flemish writer
Theodoor Rombouts (1597–1637), Flemish painter
Theodoor van der Schuer (1634–1707), Dutch painter
Theodoor Philibert Tromp (1903–1984), Dutch politician and engineer
Theodoor van Thulden (1606–1669), Dutch painter
Theodoor van Tulden (died 1645), Dutch law professor
Theodoor Hendrik van de Velde (1873–1937), Dutch physician and gynæcologist
Theodoor Verhaegen (1701–1759). Flemish sculptor
 (1848–1929), Dutch composer
Theodoor Verstraete (1850–1907), Belgian Realist painter
 (1805–1849), Dutch poet and publisher
Theodoor Wilkens (1690–1748, Dutch painter
Theodoor Johan Arnold van Zijll de Jong (1836–1917), Dutch military leader
 (1813–1881), Dutch lawyer and politician

See also
Theodor
Théodore (disambiguation)
Theodora (disambiguation)
Theodorus (disambiguation)

Dutch masculine given names